Vanuatu is participating in the 2012 Summer Paralympics in London, United Kingdom, from August 29 to September 9, 2012. The country initially hoped to send athletes to compete in wheelchair tennis and track and field. Ultimately, however, its delegation was to consist in only one athlete, Marcel Houssimoli, in three sprinting events. He was the country's flag-bearer during the Games' opening ceremony.

Athletics

Marcel Houssimoli, a right hand amputee, received a wildcard invitation to compete in the men's 100m and 200m in the T37 disability category, and in the men's 400m T38. As the country's only competitor, he was also the country's opening ceremonies flag bearer.

In heat 1 in the 200m, he finished sixth and last, in 30.12 s. He was the only athlete not to use the starting blocks, and finished more than five seconds behind fifth-placed Rhys Jones of Great Britain.

In heat 1 in the 400m, he finished fifth and last, in 1:09.03, more than fifteen seconds behind the other athletes; the crowd cheered him on to the finish line. He was the only T37 athlete in the race; his opponents, categorised T38, had a lower level of disability. Despite his slow time, he qualified for the final as a fastest loser. He finished seventh and last in the final, improving his time to 1:07.61, fourteen seconds behind sixth-placed Marius Stander of South Africa.

In heat 1 in the 100m, he finished 9th and last, in 14.55.

Men's Track and Road Events

See also
Summer Paralympic disability classification
Vanuatu at the Paralympics
Vanuatu at the 2012 Summer Olympics

Notes

Nations at the 2012 Summer Paralympics
2012
Paralympics